Șerban Sturdza (born 14 September 1947) is a Romanian architect, former president of the Order of Architects in Romania, current vice president of Pro Patrimonio. and correspondent member of the Romanian Academy (2010).

References 

1947 births
Living people
Romanian architects
Corresponding members of the Romanian Academy